Coline Aumard (born 13 June 1989 in Villeneuve-Saint-Georges, Paris) is a professional squash player who represents France. She reached a career-high world ranking of World No. 20 in July 2020.

Career
In 2016, she was part of the French team that won the bronze medal at the 2016 Women's World Team Squash Championships in her home country. Two years later in 2018, she won her second bronze medal was part of the French team at the 2018 Women's World Team Squash Championships.

References

External links 
 
 
 

French female squash players
Living people
1989 births
Competitors at the 2017 World Games
Competitors at the 2022 World Games
World Games bronze medalists
World Games medalists in squash
21st-century French women